The Detroit Metal Mouldings were a minor league professional ice hockey team, and member of the International Hockey League. The team joined the league in its second season, and played three seasons. The team was known as Detroit Jerry Lynch for the 1948–1949 season.

Standings

External links
 Detroit Metal Mouldings statistics
 Detroit Jerry Lynch statistics
 

International Hockey League (1945–2001) teams
M
Professional ice hockey teams in Michigan
Defunct ice hockey teams in the United States
Ice hockey clubs established in 1946
1946 establishments in Michigan
Ice hockey clubs disestablished in 1949
1949 disestablishments in Michigan